Calcium (ion) batteries are energy storage and delivery technologies (i.e., electro–chemical energy storage) that employ calcium ions (cations), Ca2+, as the active charge carrier in the electrolytes as well as in the electrodes (anode and cathode). Calcium (ion) batteries remain an active area of research, with studies and work persisting in the discovery and development of electrodes and electrolytes that enable stable, long-term battery operation.

History 
The application of calcium batteries date back to the 1960s in thermal batteries for military and space applications. The first example of an electrochemical cell was Ca//SOCl2 as a primary cell. Early examination of Ca2+ intercalation hosts proposed transition metal oxides and sulfides. The study of calcium batteries as well as calcium electro-chemistry has continued since then, and has seen expanded research owing to recent developments in effective Ca-metal redox activity, particularly at room temperature, which had been a longstanding challenge in the field.

Benefits and advantages

Material properties 
In terms of inherent materials properties, calcium metal is known for its high conductivity and very high melting temperature (842 °C) relative to other metals. The higher melting temperature can make calcium metal inherently safer. Calcium is also an environmentally benign element, mitigating concerns over toxicity.

Resource and supply 
Calcium batteries are considered a next generation battery or post-Li-ion battery energy storage system, namely one of the many candidates that may potentially replace lithium-ion battery technology. It is also a multivalent battery. Key advantages are lower cost, earth abundance (41,500 ppm), higher energy density, by a combination of high capacity and a high cell voltage, and potentially higher power output. Calcium is the 5th most abundant mineral in the Earth's crust, and the most abundant alkaline earth metal, and the third most abundant metal after aluminum (Al) and iron (Fe). The United States is the largest producer (by annual production) of calcium sources (primarily lime), promising domestic supply and manufacture. Other major producers include Russia and China.

Electrochemistry 
As compared to other divalent systems, calcium batteries have a possibility of higher cell voltages than magnesium batteries due to the 0.5 V lower standard reduction potential of the former. Ca2+ ions also have the potential for faster reaction kinetics as compared to magnesium (Mg2+) owing to its less polarizing properties and charge density both in the electrolyte as well as in an intercalation cathode.

Capacity and energy density 
Calcium metal anodes have a 2+ oxidation state which would provide a greater energy density over monovalent systems (i.e., Li+ and Na+), and it has a standard reduction potential  of 2.9 V, which is only 0.17 V greater than that of lithium metal.  A calcium metal anode offers a higher volumetric capacity and gravimetric capacities (2072 mAh.mL−1 and 1337 mAh.g−1, respectively) than current commercial graphite anodes in Li-ion batteries (300–430 mAh mL−1 and 372 mAh g−1). A calcium sulfur (Ca//S) battery has theoretical energy densities of 3202 Wh/L and 1835 Wh/kg, versus 2800 Wh/L for Li//S.

Battery components 
Currently, a calcium (ion) battery has yet to be commercialized, but remains in the realm of research and development. Efforts concentrate on developing effective anode and cathode materials, as well as stable electrolytes. Intensive focus has been placed on achieving reliable electrochemistry with a pure calcium metal anode in order to achieve high operating voltages, capacities, and energy densities. However, carbon and metal oxide based anodes, while providing lower performance metrics, are also reliable. Cathodes has sought to achieve high Ca2+ migration kinetics, high capacity, as well as high operative voltages.

Electrolytes

Calcium salt component 
Salts explored thus far in liquid electrolytes include: calcium tetrafluoroborate (Ca(BF4)2, calcium borohydride (Ca(BH4)2, calcium bis(trifluoromethanesulfonimide) (Ca(TFSI)2), calcium perchlorate (Ca(ClO4)2), and calcium hexafluorophosphate (Ca(PF6)2), and calcium nitrate (Ca(NO3)2). Calcium nitrate is commonly used in aqueous batteries. Early studies revealed that reversible Ca deposition using simple Ca salts are impossible at room temperature. A Ca salt using a bulky low-coordinating tetra-hexafluoroisopropoxy borate anion [Ca(B(Ohfip)4)2] have been examined by three research groups independently and shown to be active for Ca deposition at room temperature with the Coulumbic efficiency up to 80% and anodic stability up to 4.1 V vs Ca. The [Ca(B(Ohfip)4)2] electrolyte remains to be the most active electrolyte for Ca deposition, but still far below the standard for practical applications.

Liquid electrolytes 
Several different electrolyte systems have been examined for calcium (ion) batteries. Electrolytes are still an area of investigation, where previous work has shown that many show low electrochemical stability. Redox reactions on calcium metal in several organic electrolytes was initially examined and concluded no Ca deposition using (Ca(ClO4)2) and Ca(BF4)2 in organic solvents. Water as the electrolyte has been examined in a calcium ion battery. Alkyl carbonate electrolyte have also been examined. Theoretical studies have also been conducted on both salts and aprotic solvents showing on favorable solvation/de-solvation properties. This has also been followed by experimental observations of salt solvation by different solvents. Ionic liquids have also been examined. Mixed cation electrolytes with Li/Ca and Na/Ca (BH4- and PF6- anion) have been examined with promising solvent and SEI properties.

Polymer electrolytes 
Polymer electrolytes have also been examined to provide the combined functions as both the battery separator and the electrolyte. One of the first samples of a polymer electrolyte was PVA/PVP complexed with CaCl2. Subsequent studies demonstrated polymer electrolytes made from poly(ethylene glycol) diacrylate (PEDGA) and polytetrahydrofuran (PTHF) both with calcium nitrate (Ca(NO3)2), polyethylene oxide, single-ion conducting polymers based on PEG and PTHF backbones and TFSI anions, and PEDGA-based gel polymer electrolytes, using such solvents as alkyl carbonates and ionic liquid solvents. Most recently, a poly(vinyl imidazole) electrolytes demonstrated one of the highest conductivities for Ca2+ to date.

Solid electrolytes 
Solid electrolytes (i.e., ceramics) have been proposed for the transport of calcium ions, but studies remain theoretical.

Anodes 
Calcium anodes have focused on using metal anodes, metal oxides, carbons, as well as metals/semiconductors as alloying compounds.

Examples of anode materials include vanadium oxide (V2O5), copper-calcium alloying, MgV2O5, graphite, metallic calcium, and silicon anodes. Recent work on plating/stripping calcium was done in ethylene carbonate/propylene carbonate (EC/PC) solutions at elevated temperatures. Calcium metal anodes have also shown practical plating at room temperature in different electrolytes such as tetrahydrofuran (THF) and a binary mixture of ethylene carbonate and propylene carbonate (EC/PC). Aqueous batteries (namely those employing water as the solvent component of the electrolyte) have used calcium vanadate. Graphene like materials, such as hexa-peri-hexabenzocoronene nanographene, have also been considered as Ca2+ anodes.

Cathodes 
Cathode materials for calcium seek to provide suitable material structures for the reliable storage and release of calcium ions. Primary work on calcium cathodes have focused on the experimental and theoretical investigation of intercalation compounds as well as sulfur as a conversion cathode.

Significant progress has been made with employing materials that are generally good intercalation materials for ions, as well as specifically ceramics with crystal structures that provide low migration energy barriers for Ca2+ to move through the lattice. The divalency and large ionic radius of calcium necessitates intercalation hosts with relatively open crystal frameworks and milder crystal polarization to help facilitate better diffusion kinetics. Layered materials, whereby Ca2+ is transported through the van der Waals gap, is also an approach to enable faster diffusion.

Thus far calcium metal oxides and sulfides are areas of study. Cathodes examined recently include calcium manganese oxide, calcium cobalt oxide and titanium disulfide, as well as hexacyanoferrates, or dual carrier batteries, as well as for aqueous calcium ion batteries. Theoretical work has been performed to ascertain the potential of cathodes from different crystal structures such as perovskite (CaMO3), spinel (CaM2O4), other naturally occurring calcium compounds, metal selenides such as TiSe2, as well as other calcium lanthanide oxide phases.

Extensive examinations of the migration energy barriers have also discussed.

Conversion cathodes, such as the use of sulfur, is also a viable solution that may overcome setbacks with intercalation hosts.

Calcium–sulfur batteries 
A primary Ca–S battery was examined. Ca-S batteries have also been examined using Li as a mediator to make it reversible. The discovery of reliable electrolytes for plating/stripping calcium metal have aided in stable Ca//S battery cycling, however, poly-sulfide dissolution remains at issue to long term performance.

Calcium–air batteries 
In addition, a calcium–air (Ca–O2) batteries have also been examined. Unlike Li-O2 batteries, in which lithium can form a superoxide that undergoes easy redox activity, calcium only oxidizes to the extremely chemical stable calcium oxide (CaO), hence suitable catalysts systems are required to aid in the reduction of CaO during battery recharging. Reliable plating and stripping at the Ca anode is also critical to battery performance.

Investigated battery cells and performance metrics 
Several calcium metal batteries with different cathodes have thus far been examined: Ca//V2O5, Ca//Ca4Fe9O17, Ca//LiTiO2, Ca/Carbon-Fiber, Ca//TiS2, Ca//FePO4, Ca//Ca3Co2O6, Ca//PAQ, and Ca//S. C-rates range from 0.2 to >5 C. Capacities thus far achieved range from 50-250 mAh/g, with operating voltages between 1 and 4 V. Current densities are in the range of 20–500 mA/g, and energy densities of ~250 Wh/kg.

Applications 
Owing in the potentially greater weight of calcium batteries, they have been proposed for use in stationary applications, such as grid storage. Portable electronics as well as electric vehicle applications may be possible if gravimetric capacities and current densities are improved.

Notable research initiatives 
There are several groups and consortia dedicated to the aim of producing commercial-grade rechargeable calcium batteries, for example, the CARBAT (Europe) and the Syracuse Center of Excellence (USA), and the Joint Center for Energy Storage Research (USA).

Challenges 
Calcium batteries currently show capacity fading and relatively lower energy densities than Li-metal batteries, but there are concerted efforts aiming to overcome these issues. The solid electrolyte interface (SEI) also shows slow migration of Ca2+ ions. Ca metal also undergoes dendritic growth at high current rates. The nature of the calcium deposits are also critical for long-term battery operation, with efforts aiming to produce high quality, uniform deposits. Calcium batteries that provide comparable energy densities of incumbent Li-ion and Li-metal batteries require a pure Ca metal anode to be employed. Calcium is a significantly hard metal compared to lithium, which will have to be addressed for practical integration of calcium foils in battery manufacture, such as pouch and cylindrical cells.

Calcium salts of generally show strong coordination between the Ca2+ and the anion, consequently requiring strongly coordinating solvents, such as carbonates, in order to produce electrolytes with sufficient salt solubility. This results in slow kinetics of plating/stripping at a Ca metal interface. More weakly coordinating salts allow for weakly coordinating solvents to be employed, which shows significantly increase kinetics.

Intercalation hosts need to provide open frameworks and simple migration pathways for the transport of calcium ions which is both larger in size (e.g. as compared to Li+) as well as has a greater charge density. This can allow for the materials to enable high charge/discharge rates.

References 

Battery (electricity)
Electricity
Electrochemistry
Energy
Calcium